A ripple effect occurs when an initial disturbance to a system propagates outward to disturb an increasingly larger portion of the system, like ripples expanding across the water when an object is dropped into it.

The ripple effect is often used colloquially to mean a multiplier in macroeconomics. For example, an individual's reduction in spending reduces the incomes of others and their ability to spend.

In sociology, the ripple effect can be observed in how social interactions can affect situations not directly related to the initial interaction, and in charitable activities where information can be disseminated and passed from the community to broaden its impact.

The concept has been applied in computer science within the field of software metrics as a complexity measure.

Examples

The Weinstein effect and the rise of the Me Too movement 
In October 2017, according to The New York Times and The New Yorker, dozens of women have accused American film producer Harvey Weinstein, former founder of Miramax Films and The Weinstein Company, of rape, sexual assault and sexual abuse for over a period of three decades. Shortly after over eighty accusations, Harvey was dismissed from his own company, expelled from the Academy of Motion Picture Arts and Sciences and other professional associations, and even retired from public view. The allegations against him results in the Weinstein effect, a global trend involving a serial number of sexual misconduct allegations towards other famous men in Hollywood, such as Louis CK and Kevin Spacey. The effect lead to the formation of the controversial Me Too movement, where people share their experiences of sexual harassment/assault.

See also
Butterfly effect⁣ — an effect where a minimal change in one state of a system results in large differences in its later state.
Clapotis — a non-breaking standing wave with higher amplitude than the waves it's composed of.
Domino effect — an effect where one event sets off a chain of non-incremental other events.
Snowball effect — an effect where a process starting from an initial state of small significance builds upon itself in time.

References

Metaphors referring to objects
Causality
Social phenomena
Economics effects
Software metrics